Pleasant Hill is an unincorporated community located in Lancaster County, South Carolina, United States. The area consists of some businesses and churches lining US 521 and houses located along other roads in the area. A Lancaster and Chester Railroad line runs through Pleasant Hill.

References

Unincorporated communities in Lancaster County, South Carolina